Kovdorsky District is an administrative district (raion), one of the six in Murmansk Oblast, Russia. It is located to the west of the Kola Peninsula. Its administrative center is the town of Kovdor. Population:  The population of Kovdor accounts for 88.4% of the district's total population.

History
The district was formed by the November 29, 1979 Decree by the Presidium of the Supreme Soviet of the Russian SFSR from parts of the territory subordinated to the town of Apatity.

Municipal status
As a municipal division, the territory of the district is incorporated as Kovdorsky Urban Okrug.

Economy
The majority industries in the area are metallurgy and building materials. Mining is also a very important industry, and it was one of the earliest industries in the region. Minerals mined in the district include mica, iron, and vermiculite. Commercial production of mica in the district began in 1934.

Demographics
As of 2010, the district's population is 21,297. The population is declining due to emigration and natural decrease.

Politics
The local representative body is the Council of Deputies of Kovdorsky District. It has eighteen members elected for a term of five years. The Head of the District is the highest executive post and is elected by popular vote for a five-year term.

Notable residents 

Anna Cholovyaga (born 1992), footballer

References

Notes

Sources

Districts of Murmansk Oblast
States and territories established in 1979